Gérard Buchheit (born 30 September 1948) is a French middle-distance runner. He competed in the men's 3000 metres steeplechase at the 1972 Summer Olympics.

References

External links
 

1948 births
Living people
People from Haguenau
Athletes (track and field) at the 1972 Summer Olympics
French male middle-distance runners
French male steeplechase runners
Olympic athletes of France
Place of birth missing (living people)
Sportspeople from Bas-Rhin
20th-century French people